Drenched is the third full-length album by Miracle Legion, and the only recorded on the Morgan Creek Records label, released in 1992.

Release
Released on both CD and cassette, the 11 song LP Drenched was released under Morgan Creek Records in 1992. The songs were composed by Mark Mulcahy and Ray Neal.

Track listing
All songs written by Mark Mulcahy and Ray Neal, except where noted

Personnel
Mark Mulcahy - vocals
Ray Neal - guitar
Scott Boutier - drums
Dave McCaffrey - bass

References

1992 albums
Miracle Legion albums
Morgan Creek Records albums